KOKI-TV (channel 23) is a television station in Tulsa, Oklahoma, United States, affiliated with the Fox network. It is owned by Imagicomm Communications alongside MyNetworkTV affiliate KMYT-TV (channel 41). The two stations share studios on East 27th Street and South Memorial Drive (near W. G. Skelly Park) in the Audubon neighborhood of southeast Tulsa; KOKI-TV's transmitter is located on South 273rd East Avenue (between 91st Street South and 101st Street South, next to the Muskogee Turnpike) in the western city limits of Coweta.

History

As an independent station
The UHF channel 23 allocation—which had been dormant since a short-lived attempt to revive its original occupant, KCEB, by original licensee Elfred Beck foundered in September 1967—was contested between two groups that vied to hold the construction permit to build a new television station on the frequency. The first prospective permittee was Wilson Communications, owned by Detroit businessman and Buffalo Bills owner Ralph Wilson, which filed an application with the Federal Communications Commission (FCC) on July 7, 1978. The second applicant, Tulsa 23, Ltd. (originally Channel 23 Tulsa, Ltd.), filed on September 5; that group—led by managing partner Benjamin F. Boddie, Corporate Vice President, Williams Companies. The FCC granted the license to the Tulsa 23 venture on December 12, 1979.

KOKI-TV signed on the air on October 26, 1980, a date chosen by Lavenstein at the suggestion of marketing and promotions manager Richard Enderwood, as it coincided with Enderwood's birthday. It was the first commercial television station to sign on in the Tulsa market since NBC affiliate KVOO-TV (channel 2, now KJRH-TV) signed on 26 years earlier on December 5, 1954, and the first independent station to begin operation in a market that, on paper, had a large enough population to provide suitable viewership for an independent station since the early 1970s. The station—which was then branded as "Tulsa 23," accompanied by a futuristic logo in which the numerical "23" was construed as the "LS" in "Tulsa"—originally operated from studio facilities located on East 46th Place (between Memorial Drive and Sheridan Road) in southeast Tulsa, which was fitted with used transmission equipment acquired second-hand from various other American television stations. The station operated on a lean budget, maintaining a general entertainment programming format that featured a mix of classic sitcoms, westerns and drama series, cartoons, and a limited number of sports events and religious programs. The Tulsa 23 partnership purchased programming at low cost and tailored its schedule to appeal to older and rural demographics, leaving much of the higher-rated and more recent syndicated content to be acquired by its network-affiliated competitors, KJRH, CBS affiliate KOTV (channel 6) and ABC affiliate KTUL (channel 8). KOKI was opportunistic with its programming acquisitions on occasion, and picked up broadcast rights to college and major league sporting events.

KOKI heavily emphasized feature films as part of its schedule during this period, typically offering a single film in the afternoon and one to two films during prime time each weekday, and three or four films per day on Saturdays and Sundays. One of the station's regular film presentations was Creature Feature, hosted by Sherman Oaks (the stage name of local comedian Jim Millaway), alongside Gailard Sartain and Jeanne Tripplehorn (then known as Jeanne Summers, who left after the program's first season), both of whom worked as radio hosts for KMOD-FM (97.5) at the time. Showcasing horror and science fiction B movies each Saturday night from October 1982 until October 1985, it featured wraparound segments before and after commercial breaks in which the hosts conducted various skits, often making ridiculous non-sequitur remarks. KOKI would gain a competitor on March 18, 1981, when a joint venture between Green Country Associates and Satellite Syndicated Systems signed on fellow independent KGCT-TV (channel 41, now MyNetworkTV affiliate KMYT-TV) with a mix of syndicated entertainment programs, locally produced news and talk programming in the afternoon, and movies, sports and specials from the In-Home Theatre (IT) subscription service at night. (Within three months of its debut, KGCT transitioned to a hybrid format consisting of daytime general entertainment programming on weekdays and weekend mornings, and IT subscription programming at night throughout the week and on weekend afternoons.) Despite its low-cost approach, KOKI became a major force in the market; this was evidenced in a 1983 study by New York City-based advertising and marketing firm Ogilvy & Mather examining Tulsa's commercial television stations, which showed that KOKI was the only station to increase viewership shares over the two-year period from May 1981 to May 1983, rising from a 6 to a 19 share in early evenings, from a 5 to a 9 in prime time and from a 4 to a 10 share against late newscasts on the three network affiliates, whereas KJRH, KOTV, and KTUL saw steady declines in those same dayparts, which were linked to KOKI's overall growth.

The slogan used to promote its film offerings from the station's sign-on until 1984—"Oklahoma's Movie Star," based on the title of the station's Movie Star film presentations—would be the center of a federal trademark infringement lawsuit that Tulsa 23 Ltd. filed against Home Box Office Inc. in October 1982 over the use of the "We Are Your Movie Star" image campaign implemented by HBO's sister premium service, Cinemax, earlier that year. Judge James Ellison, who presided over the case filed with the U.S. District Court for the Eastern District of Oklahoma, granted an injunction against Home Box Office in November 1983, on grounds that the Cinemax campaign had infringed upon KOKI's trademark. HBO appealed the ruling in the Denver-based Tenth Circuit U.S. Court of Appeals, which upheld Ellison's injunction order in a ruling handed down on December 9, forcing Cinemax to discontinue the campaign and begin developing a replacement marketing initiative ("We're Taking You to the Stars," which Cinemax used as its image campaign slogan until 1986).

As a Fox affiliate
Partly because of its status as the strongest of the market's two independent stations, in early August 1986, in advance of the network's launch, News Corporation announced that it had reached an agreement with Tulsa 23 Ltd., in which KOKI-TV was named the Tulsa charter affiliate of the Fox Broadcasting Company.

KOKI-TV affiliated with Fox when the fledgling network began programming on October 9, 1986, with the premiere of late-night talk show The Late Show Starring Joan Rivers. Though it was technically a network affiliate, Channel 23 continued to be programmed as a de facto independent station as Fox offered a limited schedule of programming during the network's early years of operation. Even after the network's programming expanded with the launch of a three-hour Sunday night lineup in April 1987, Fox offered prime time programs exclusively on weekend evenings until September 1989, when it began a five-year expansion towards a nightly prime time schedule. (It would take seven years for Fox to offer prime time programs on all seven nights of the week, completing the expansion with the rollout of its Monday night lineup in January 1993.) Until the network's expansion was completed, KOKI continued to air a movie at 7:00 p.m. on nights when the network did not offer any programming. In 1988, the station moved its operations into a low-rise office building on East 54th Street and South Yale Avenue (near LaFortune Park) in southeast Tulsa, which was named Fox Plaza.

Clear Channel ownership
After trying for several years to offload KOKI-TV, the Tulsa 23 partnership secured a willing buyer on March 6, 1989, when it reached an agreement to sell the station to San Antonio, Texas-based Clear Channel Television for $6.075 million. Citing that KOKI had not generated a profit for some time as a result of an economic downturn spurred by an oil exploration slump in the region during the 1980s, division parent Clear Channel Communications (now iHeartMedia)—which had owned KMOD-FM and KAKC (1300 AM) since the company, as San Antonio Broadcasting Corp., acquired the two radio stations from Unicorn Inc. in 1973—applied for a "failing station" waiver of FCC ownership rules that then prohibited common ownership of television and radio stations in the same market on the basis that the combined ownership would provide KOKI with needed financial support to remain operational and expand its public affairs programming. The sale and cross-ownership waiver received FCC approval on November 17, 1989; the transaction was finalized in late February 1990. (KOKI would gain additional radio sisters when Clear Channel purchased KQLL-AM-FM [1430, now KTBZ, and 106.1, now KTGX] and KOAS [92.1 FM, now KTBT] from Federated Media for $15.4 million in April 1996; as the Telecommunications Act eliminated the radio-television cross-ownership restrictions, the company acquired the two stations without amending the earlier waiver.)

Under Clear Channel's stewardship, the station – which, in compliance with Fox's stricter branding requirements, phased out the "Tulsa 23" branding in favor of identifying as "KOKI Fox 23" in September 1990 – significantly upgraded its programming, acquiring the rights to more recent sitcoms, higher-quality feature film titles and some first-run talk shows for its schedule. It would also begin to rely on Fox Kids for much of its children's programming inventory after Fox launched the children's program block in September 1990; as such, many of the syndicated children's programs that KOKI had aired to occupy portions of the weekday daytime and Saturday morning time periods were gradually relegated to early morning time slots as well as around the network-supplied daytime and Saturday blocks. With these changes, coupled with the growth of the Fox network into a major competitor to the Big Three networks during the early part of that decade, KOKI was generating respectable profits by the middle of the decade.

On November 3, 1993, Clear Channel Television entered into a local marketing agreement with RDS Broadcasting – which had relaunched channel 41 (as independent station KTFO) in May 1991, after completing its purchase of the dormant license—to provide programming, advertising and other administrative services for KTFO, which would subsequently move that station's operations from its existing studio facilities on Garnett Avenue in southeast Tulsa into the Fox Plaza facility. Both KOKI and KTFO pooled programming inventories, with the latter acquiring additional talk and reality shows as well as more recent first-run and off-network sitcoms and drama series to complement channel 23's offerings (although many higher-rated syndicated shows continued to air on KOKI). As was the trend for many Fox affiliates, channel 23 gradually shifted the focus of its syndication inventory away from classic sitcoms and syndicated children's programs during the latter half of the 1990s, becoming increasingly reliant on talk, reality and court shows to fill portions of its daytime schedule; more recent sitcoms were added to occupy early-evening and late night timeslots. The station continued to run Fox Kids programming on weekdays until its afternoon block was discontinued in December 2001, at which time, it replaced the children's programs on weekday mid-afternoons with additional talk shows and game shows; it retained the remaining Saturday morning children's lineup (which was relaunched FoxBox in September 2002, and was later branded as 4Kids TV from September 2005 until December 2008, when Fox stopped providing children's programming after declining to renew its agreement with time-lease partner 4Kids Entertainment).

On December 15, 1999, four months after the FCC began permitting any commercial broadcasting firm the ability to legally own two commercial television stations within the same media market, Clear Channel announced it would acquire the KTFO license outright as part of a four-station deal with the San Antonio-based Mercury Broadcasting Company worth $11.663 million. The sale was approved by the FCC on March 9, 2000; following consummation of the transaction that May, KOKI and KTFO became the first legal broadcast television duopoly in the Tulsa market. In January 2002, Clear Channel relocated the operations of KOKI and KTFO from Fox Plaza into a  studio complex located at 2625 South Memorial Drive. The building—which was originally constructed in 1962 for an expansion of the Oertle's Family Discount Store and later rented out to house a Burlington Coat Factory location—was purchased to allow the operations of the two television stations and Clear Channel's five Tulsa radio properties (which had previously operated from the Mid-Oklahoma Building on 41st Street and Skelly Drive in southwest Tulsa) to be housed under a single facility as well as to allow KOKI/KTFO to commence digital television transmissions and news operations. (An additional  of building space was reserved for the Clear Channel Event Center exhibition complex.)

Newport Television ownership
On April 20, 2007, following the completion of the company's $18.7-billion purchase by private equity firms Thomas H. Lee Partners and Bain Capital, Clear Channel entered into an agreement to sell its television stations to Providence Equity Partners for $1.2 billion. The sale was approved by the FCC on December 1, 2007; after settling a lawsuit by Clear Channel ownership to force the equity firm to complete the sale, the Providence acquisition was finalized on March 14, 2008, at which time it formed Newport Television as a holding company to own and manage 27 of Clear Channel's 35 television stations (including KOKI and KMYT), and began transferring the remaining nine stations (all in markets where conflicts with FCC ownership rules precluded a legal duopoly from continuing under Newport) to High Plains Broadcasting, a licensee corporation formed to allow those stations to remain operationally tied to their associated Newport-owned outlets through local marketing agreements.

On August 11, 2011, William Sturdivant II—a then-25-year-old with a history of mental health issues, including once reportedly being apprehended on such an event after walking  from Tulsa to Dallas, and an arrest record that included charges for burglary and drug possession – was found wandering in an area outside the KOKI/KMYT/Clear Channel Radio facility on Memorial Drive that was not authorized for public access, where he was chased onto the building's roof by security guards and climbed up to the  mark of an adjacent  transmission tower owned by Clear Channel for use by its radio stations and as an auxiliary tower for KOKI. After more than 150 hours (the longest standoff in the Tulsa Police Department's history, breaking the record set by a 1993 standoff involving a murder suspect that lasted for 32 hours), the standoff ended at around 6:40 p.m. on August 16, after retired Tulsa Police negotiator Tyrone Lynn was sent up the tower by crane to take Sturdivant—who, after being lowered to the ground by a Tulsa Fire Department cherry picker, was transported to the Hillcrest Medical Center to be treated for severe dehydration, heat exhaustion and burns sustained to his uncovered feet from navigating the tower beams in temperatures exceeding —down from the tower.

Cox Media Group ownership
As part of a series of piecemeal sales announced on July 19, 2012 that also involved the larger Nexstar Broadcasting Group and Sinclair Broadcast Group, Newport Television announced that it would sell KOKI-TV and KMYT as well as fellow Fox affiliate WAWS (now WFOX-TV) and the intellectual assets of CBS affiliate WTEV-TV (now WJAX-TV) in Jacksonville, Florida, to the Cox Media Group subsidiary of Atlanta-based Cox Enterprises for $253.011 million. The purchase placed the KOKI-KMYT duopoly under common ownership with Cox Radio's Tulsa cluster of KRMG (740 AM and 102.3 FM), KRAV-FM (96.5), KWEN (95.5 FM) and KJSR (103.3 FM), and, in the first instance since the 2003 repeal of an FCC cross-ownership ban in which the owner of a local cable provider acquired a television station in the same market, also made the two stations sister properties to Cox Communications, which has been the dominant cable operator in northeastern Oklahoma since it acquired Tele-Communications Inc. (TCI)'s Tulsa-area franchise in April 2000. The FCC approved the transaction on October 23, 2012; the sale was finalized on December 3. Although the sale separated KOKI/KMYT from its former radio sisters under Clear Channel ownership, iHeartMedia's Tulsa cluster continued to operate out of the Memorial Drive facility until the summer of 2017, when Cox moved its Tulsa-area radio stations into the building and iHeart moved its local stations into a new facility on Yale Avenue and 71st Street (northeast of Oral Roberts University) in southeast Tulsa's Richmond Hills section.

On February 15, 2019, private equity firm Apollo Global Management announced that it would acquire the respective television properties of Cox Media Group and Northwest Broadcasting and Cox's other print and broadcast properties in Atlanta and Dayton, Ohio (including the Atlanta Journal-Constitution, the Dayton Daily News, and the company's respective radio clusters in those two markets) in a deal valued at $3.1 billion that would result in Cox Enterprises maintaining a minority interest in the acquired properties. Although the group originally planned to operate under the name Terrier Media, it was later announced on June 26 that Apollo would retain the Cox Media Group name post-acquisition, along with acquiring Cox's advertising business and the remainder of its Cox Radio unit (including its five Tulsa-area radio stations). The sale was completed on December 17, 2019.

Sale to Imagicomm
On March 29, 2022, Cox Media Group announced it would sell KOKI-TV, KMYT-TV and 16 other stations to Imagicomm Communications, an affiliate of the parent company of the INSP cable channel, for $488 million; the sale was completed on August 1.

Subchannel history

KOKI-DT2
KOKI-DT2 is the MeTV-affiliated second digital subchannel of KOKI-TV, broadcasting in standard definition on channel 23.2. KOKI-TV launched a digital subchannel on virtual channel 23.2 in April 2011, originally serving as an affiliate of music video-focused network TheCoolTV through a groupwide agreement between network parent Cool Music Network, LLC and Newport Television, involving Newport-operated stations in ten markets. On July 30, 2012, through an affiliation agreement reached between Newport Television and network owner Weigel Broadcasting, KOKI-DT2 became an affiliate of the classic television network MeTV.

KOKI-DT3
KOKI-DT3 is the Dabl-affiliated third digital subchannel of KOKI-TV, broadcasting in widescreen standard definition on channel 23.3. On July 17, 2014, Katz Broadcasting announced it had signed an agreement with Cox Media Group to carry Escape on the group's television stations in Tulsa and Charlotte, as well as sister network Grit in Orlando. KOKI-TV launched a digital subchannel on virtual channel 23.3 as an affiliate of Escape on August 18, 2014. (Court TV—for which Escape was renamed under the secondary brand Court TV Mystery (now Ion Mystery) in September 2019—is carried locally over the DT4 subchannel of KJRH, which is owned by Katz's corporate parent, the E. W. Scripps Company.).

On July 4, 2021, Court TV Mystery was replaced by Dabl.

Programming
KOKI-TV currently broadcasts the majority of the Fox network schedule, with the sole exception being the infomercial block Weekend Marketplace, electing to air either a mix of educational and lower-profile syndicated programs as well as infomercials slotted by KOKI/KMYT's programming department or Fox Sports programming in its Saturday morning timeslot. Channel 23 may preempt some Fox programs to provide long-form breaking news or severe weather coverage when necessary. The preempted programs may either be diverted to KMYT-TV on a live-to-air basis (resulting in the lower-priority MyNetworkTV schedule being run on tape delay during the late-access or overnight hours) or rebroadcast over KOKI in place of regularly scheduled late-night programs, although station personnel also gives viewers the option of watching them on Fox's proprietary streaming platforms (including its website, mobile app or the FoxNow streaming service), Hulu, or its cable/satellite video-on-demand service the day after their initial airing.

In addition to airing programming supplied by the network directly, channel 23 carries Xploration Station, a live-action educational program block that is distributed primarily to Fox stations by Steve Rotfeld Productions. While the block usually follows the Saturday edition of Fox 23 News This Morning, Fox Sports programming—especially during the college football and basketball seasons—will often subject some Xploration Station programs to be deferred to other daytime slots (either a weekday slot normally filled by the secondary run of a syndicated program or an open weekend afternoon slot that would be occupied by feature films or paid programming in lieu of a scheduled Fox Sports telecast) to allow KOKI to fulfill federal educational programming obligations.

Channel 23 formerly served as the Muscular Dystrophy Association (MDA)'s "Love Network" station for the Tulsa market, carrying the charity's annual telethon on Labor Day and the preceding Sunday night each September from 2000 to 2010. For most of its run on the station, KOKI – which became among a handful of stations not affiliated with NBC, CBS or ABC to have ever carried the telethon upon assuming the local broadcast rights from KOTV – usually aired the telethon on a two-hour tape delay (airing after its 9:00 p.m. newscast from the 2002 edition onward) on the Sunday preceding Labor Day because of Fox entertainment and sports programming commitments. For this reason, in order to accommodate the six-hour prime time format (substantially downscaled from its longtime 21½-hour broadcast format) implemented with its September 2011 edition, KOKI/KMYT management elected to shift the MDA Telethon rights to sister station KMYT-TV for what would be its final two years as a syndicated telecast. (The event—by then reduced to a two-hour special—moved to ABC, airing thereafter by association on KTUL until the final telecast of the retitled MDA Show of Strength in August 2014.))

Sports programming
From 1980 until 1987, KOKI-TV held the local syndication rights to broadcast Major League Baseball games from the Kansas City Royals produced by their flagship broadcaster at the time, Kansas City NBC affiliate WDAF-TV (now a Fox affiliate). (The local broadcast rights to the Royals transferred to KGCT for the 1988 season.) Its relationship with the league expanded in 1985, when carried games involving the St. Louis Cardinals (which were distributed by Anheuser-Busch's sports syndication subsidiary, Bud Sports); after a two-year stint on KGCT, Cardinals telecasts returned to channel 23 for the 1988 season. (All Cardinals telecasts moved to Tulsa Cable Television channel 3 [now Cox-operated YurView Oklahoma], or on channel 20 in the event of conflicts with sporting events carried on the primary public access channel, for the 1990 season.) Both the Cardinals and the Royals have had select games carried on KOKI each season since 1996, through Fox's broadcasting contract with Major League Baseball.

From 1989 to 1991, KOKI held the local broadcast rights to NFL preseason games involving the Dallas Cowboys; the station, which assumed the local preseason telecast rights to the teams from KGCT as a result of that station's two-year operational cessation, carried six to eight prime time Cowboys game telecasts annually. In addition, for the 1990 season (the first year that the NFL allowed a live preseason game to air on a team's out-of-market station), the station carried preseason games involving the Kansas City Chiefs, running four prime time game telecasts during that season. The rights to both the Cowboys and Chiefs telecasts transferred to KGCT beginning with the 1991 NFL preseason. Since September 1994, most Cowboys telecasts carried on KOKI consist of those carried regionally or nationally by Fox, which through the network's contract with the NFL, holds primary broadcast rights to the National Football Conference (NFC). In addition to carrying Fox-televised games involving in-conference opponents, since 2014, Cowboys games carried on the station also include certain cross-flexed games against opponents in the American Football Conference (AFC) that were originally scheduled to air on CBS. (Most Cowboys preseason games not televised by Fox or by other broadcast or cable networks are carried over-the-air locally on CW affiliate KQCW [channel 19] through that station's agreement with the team's syndication service.)

From 1989 to 1992, KOKI carried regular season and postseason college basketball games involving teams from the Big Eight Conference (distributed by Raycom Sports) and the Missouri Valley Conference (distributed by Creative Sports Marketing), which gave the station rights to select regular season games featuring the Oklahoma Sooners, the Oklahoma State Cowboys and the Tulsa Golden Hurricane. Most college basketball telecasts aired on the station on Saturday afternoons, although it also occasionally carried prime time games on weeknights, specifically during the Big Eight and Missouri Valley men's tournaments. Under the Raycom agreement, KOKI also carried tape delayed broadcasts of Oklahoma Sooners football games in late night on the Sunday after the date the game was held. From 2005 to 2010, channel 23 also served as the official local broadcaster of OSU-produced analysis and magazine programs, including the weekly shows of the respective head coaches of the Cowboys' basketball, baseball and football teams. (All of the broadcasts were hosted by then-sports director Steve Layman, and were also syndicated on fellow Fox affiliate KOKH-TV in Oklahoma City.)

News operation
, KOKI-TV broadcasts 55½ hours of locally produced newscasts each week (with nine hours each weekday, 5½ hours on Saturdays and five hours on Sundays); in regards to the number of hours devoted to locally produced newscasts, it is the highest local newscast output of any television station overall in both the Tulsa market and the state of Oklahoma. In addition, the station produces the ten-minute sports highlight program Fox 23 Sports This Weekend, which airs Saturdays and Sundays at 9:50 p.m. year-round, and High School Football Tonight, a half-hour high school football highlight show that airs Fridays at 11:00 p.m. from August to November. KOKI may shift regularly scheduled newscasts that it must preempt to accommodate Fox Sports event telecasts – such as the weekend editions of the 5:00 p.m. newscast – to sister station KMYT (which had also carried a full simulcast of the weekday edition of Fox 23 News This Morning from September 2014 until December 2017).

News department history
Channel 23 has carried local news programming in various formats since its launch in October 1980. Starting at its sign-on, news programming on KOKI originally consisted mainly of 90-second newsbriefs (originally titled Newscheck 23, renamed in September 1990 as Fox 23 Newsbreak) – consisting of Associated Press wire reports and a short weather forecast read by the anchor on-call – that aired during select commercial breaks within daytime and evening programs. As Fox was urging many of its stations to begin producing their own newscasts around this time, in a May 1994 Tulsa World interview, then-general manager Hal Capron responded when asked whether KOKI might develop a news department that while the enormous cost of starting such an operation was an issue, it would format the newscast as a cutting-edge broadcast to differentiate itself from competitors KJRH, KOTV and KTUL if it went forward with such plans. In December 1995, Capron announced plans to establish a news department for KOKI. (Such plans would likely have necessitated the expansion of its existing studio facilities or the relocation to more sufficiently large building space, as its occupied space at the Fox Plaza building was not quite large enough to house a full news department.) Original estimates by Capron suggested that a half-hour prime time newscast at 9:00 p.m. would premiere on channel 23 by August 1997; however, in January 1997, Capron disclosed that the newscast's launch would be delayed to an undetermined later date. In lieu of a full-scale newscast, on January 26, 1997—immediately following Fox's telecast of Super Bowl XXXI—KOKI instead premiered First Weather on Fox 23, a nightly weather forecast program (consisting of a five-minute-long lead segment at 10:00 that aired seven nights a week, and two 60-second updates at 10:35 and 11:05 p.m. exclusively seen on weeknights) that served as lead-ins to the station's late access syndicated and network program offerings. The news updates and First Weather were discontinued in December 2001.

In the fall of 2001, KOKI finally commenced development of a full-scale news department, and hired Sean McLaughlin—who oversaw the launch of the [now-defunct] news department at then-sister station WFTC in Minneapolis two years prior, and would later join KTUL to head its news operation in 2005—to serve as news director for the expanded operation. Clear Channel invested between $5 million and $10 million into the operation, which included the purchase and renovation of the Memorial Drive building (which was selected primarily because it was of sufficient size to house a news operation) and the acquisition of top-of-the-line production equipment (including nonlinear editing and content storage hardware from Leitch Technology Corporation). 54 full- and part-time employees were also hired to staff the new operation.

Long-form newscasts began on February 3, 2002, with the launch of Fox 23 News at 9:00, the first local prime time news program ever attempted in the Tulsa market and the first attempt at a newscast produced independently from KJRH, KOTV and KTUL since channel 41 (as KGCT) shut down its news operation 20½ years earlier in June 1981. The 9:00 p.m. newscast – which has aired as an hour-long program since its premiere broadcast, which itself was delayed due to an hour-long episode of Malcolm in the Middle that followed Fox's telecast of Super Bowl XXXVI – was originally anchored by Chera Kimiko (who, prior to joining channel 23, served as weekend morning anchor at KVBC [now KSNV] in Las Vegas from 1999 to 2001) and Darren Dedo (who served as weekday morning anchor at WJTV in Jackson, Mississippi from 2000 to 2001), chief meteorologist Jon Slater (who had worked at KSHB-TV in Kansas City from 1999 to 2001, and had previous stints in Tulsa at KJRH and KTUL earlier in the 1990s) and sports director Vic Faust (who had served in that same position at KMIZ-TV in Columbia, Missouri from 1998 to 2001). (Kimiko would remain at KOKI until January 2013, and was replaced as co-anchor by Shae Rozzi, who was previously a reporter for Atlanta sister station WSB-TV; Dedo was replaced as primary co-anchor of KOKI's evening newscasts in December 2004 by former CBS Newspath Washington, D.C. reporter Clay Loney, who remains with the station , after Dedo's contract expired without renewal; Slater remained at KOKI until 2008, and was subsequently replaced by current chief James Aydelott.) The Friday and Saturday editions were initially anchored by Markova Reed (who joined the station from WLBT in Jackson, Mississippi), meteorologist George Flickinger (who was previously chief meteorologist at KTXS-TV in Abilene, Texas) and sports anchor Dave Briggs (previously with fellow Fox affiliate KEVN-TV in Rapid City, South Dakota). (Flickinger was fired without pay by KOKI management in January 2006, for cutting into Fox's November 27, 2005, broadcast of a Seattle Seahawks–New York Giants NFL game to relay an evacuation request from the Mayes County Emergency Management Agency for a major wildfire approaching residences near Chouteau.)

From the outset, the station maintained a commitment to consumer investigative reporting, with a focus on helping northeastern Oklahoma residents that have been scammed by local businesses as well as government issues. (The investigative unit—originally named the "Fox 23 Problem Solvers"—was rebranded as the "Solving Problems" unit – partly a reference to the "Breaking News, Breaking Weather, Solving Problems" slogan used by KOKI at the time – to avoid confusion with KJRH's "2NEWS Problem Solvers" unit in 2007, and later became known as "Fox 23 Investigates" in 2012.) Although legitimate competition for the newscast sprang up when KQCW became a CW charter affiliate on September 18, 2006, when it debuted the KOTV-produced News on 6 at 9:00 (which Kimiko would co-anchor for two years after joining KOTV/KQCW in June 2013, following her departure from KOKI six months earlier), prime time news viewers largely remained loyal to KOKI, which had gradually become the ratings leader in the 9:00 p.m. timeslot.

News programming on KOKI expanded quickly over the next few years. Channel 23 offered news programming outside of the established 9:00 slot for the first time on June 17, 2002, when it premiered a 5:30 p.m. Monday-through-Friday-only newscast. Acting as a local alternative to national network newscasts aired on KJRH, KOTV and KTUL in that timeslot, it featured a mix of general and financial news in a faster-paced format targeted at viewers arriving home from their afternoon commute, along with full weather and abbreviated sports segments (with the sports segment initially consisting of a live cut-in featuring Faust sitting in with KTBZ afternoon drive radio hosts Rick Couri and Don King). The August 11, 2003 premiere of a more conventional half-hour broadcast at 5:00 p.m. – which would be extended to weekends on January 9, 2016 – expanded the early evening newscast to a full hour, albeit treated as two separate half-hour programs.

The station's morning newscast, Fox 23 News This Morning (alternately titled Fox 23 News Daybreak for the first two hours until 2014), debuted on April 24, 2006 as a four-hour broadcast from 5:00 to 9:00 a.m., displacing religious programs, infomercials and syndicated children's programs that had previously aired in that time period, the latter of which were relegated to Sunday mornings. (The program would expand to 4½ hours on October 6, 2014, then to five hours, starting at 4:00 a.m., on June 20, 2016.) Formatted as a mix of local and national news, weather and traffic updates and lifestyle features, it was initially co-anchored by Ron Terrell (who originally joined KOKI in June 2004, after a four-year tenure at KOCO-TV in Oklahoma City, to succeed Faust as part of overhaul of the sports department that also saw the departures of Briggs and sports reporter/videographer Justin Holgate; Terrell remains anchor of the newscast ) and Ann Sterling (who served as one of the original anchors of the weekday morning newscast at KNXV-TV in Phoenix, and had previously worked as an evening anchor at fellow Fox affiliate and now-former sister station WXXA-TV in Albany). It was the second local newscast in the market to run after 7:00 a.m., debuting twelve years after KOTV's Six in the Morning (the 8:00 a.m. hour of which moved to KQCW in January 2008) had expanded into the slot. The station debuted an hour-long midday newscast at noon (which was originally scheduled to launch on the same date as the morning newscast) two months later on June 5, 2006; the program was moved up one hour to 11:00 a.m. on June 15, 2020.

On January 18, 2010, KOKI debuted a half-hour 10:00 p.m. newscast, which was formatted to feature a wrap-up of the day's headlines and a full weather segment during the first ten minutes, with national and world news, sports and feature reports filling the remainder of the broadcast. (The program, which originally aired only on Monday through Friday evenings, would add a Sunday edition on January 9, 2016.) On January 16, 2011, starting with the 9:00 p.m. newscast, KOKI became the second television station in the Tulsa market (behind KJRH-TV) to begin broadcasting its local newscasts in high definition, with studio segments and field video footage recorded and broadcast in true HD; with the change, the station adopted the logo, music (OSI Music's "Fox Affiliate News Theme") and graphic scheme (a modified version of the Hothaus Creative Design package originally commissioned for fellow Fox affiliate KSWB-TV in San Diego) that was based on the standardized branding of Fox's owned-and-operated stations. (This package was replaced in January 2014, with a modified version of the graphics package developed in 2009 for fellow Fox and former sister station KTVU in San Francisco [which Cox Media Group sold to Fox in 2014] as well as replacing its O&O-styled logo with a red and white variant of the secondary standard Fox affiliate logo design.)

The early evening news block would expand on September 23, 2013, when KOKI debuted a half-hour weeknight newscast at 6:00 p.m. KOKI subsequently debuted weekend morning newscasts on January 4, 2014, originally running for three hours from 7:00 to 10:00 a.m. on Saturdays and 6:00 to 9:00 a.m. on Sundays, becoming the second station in the Tulsa market (after KJRH-TV) to carry a morning news program on weekends (both broadcasts were expanded to three hours with the Sunday edition being shifted one hour earlier on April 5, 2014; the Saturday edition followed suit with the addition of a fourth hour on January 9, 2016). On August 29, 2015, KOKI entered into a content partnership with the Tulsa World to collaborate on investigative reports, coverage of local high school football games and some special projects as well as to provide local forecasts from the "Fox 23 Severe Weather Team" for the newspaper. In March 2016, KOKI unveiled the "Fox 23 SkyView Drone", an unmanned quadcopter that is used to provide aerial newsgathering of news and weather events.

Since the news department's launch and its subsequent expansion, ratings for KOKI's newscasts have statistically ranked at a strong third to, at times, second place among the Tulsa market's television news outlets; the station has seen some slow growth in viewership for its newscasts since the late 2000s, amid continuing stagnant ratings for historical last place finisher KJRH and ratings declines for once-dominant KTUL in recent years. The 2000 comedy-drama film Where the Heart Is, which was set in northeastern Oklahoma, featured a fictional depiction of KOKI incorporating live trucks and microphones with flags bearing the station's logo in a scene in which lead character Novalee Nation (Natalie Portman) is interviewed by a channel 23 reporter after giving birth inside a Sequoyah-area Wal-Mart where she was abandoned by her baby's father, Willy Jack Pickens (Dylan Bruno). However, at the time of the film's release, the station's only news programming consisted of hourly update segments (as its current news department would not be formed until a year-and-a-half after Where the Heart Is had its theatrical release).

Notable former on-air staff
 Dave Briggs – weekend evening sports anchor/sports reporter (2002–2004; now at CNN as co-anchor of Early Start)
 Sheinelle Jones – weekend evening anchor/reporter (2002–2006; now at NBC News)
 Jeanne Tripplehorn (aka Jeanne Summers) – co-host of Creature Feature (1982–1983; now a film and television actress)

Technical information

Subchannels
The station's digital signal is multiplexed:

Analog-to-digital conversion
KOKI-TV began transmitting a digital television signal on UHF channel 22 on October 1, 2002. The station shut down its analog signal, over UHF channel 23, on June 12, 2009, the official date in which full-power television stations in the United States transitioned from analog to digital broadcasts under federal mandate. The station's digital signal remained on its pre-transition UHF channel 22. Through the use of PSIP, digital television receivers display the station's virtual channel as its former UHF analog channel 23. Newport Television's decision to delay KOKI's switch to digital-only transmissions by five months, while electing to turn off the KMYT analog signal on the original transition date of February 17, 2009, was done in order to enable viewers who were not prepared for the transition to continue receiving news and emergency weather information through the spring 2009 severe weather season.

References

Tulsa TV Memories: KOKI-TV

External links
www.fox23.com - KOKI-TV official website
www.fox23.com/s/station/my41tulsa - KMYT-TV official website

OKI-TV
Fox network affiliates
MeTV affiliates
Dabl affiliates
Television channels and stations established in 1980
1980 establishments in Oklahoma
Missouri Valley Conference broadcasters
Imagicomm Communications